In procurement technology, ERFx (or eRFx) is an acronym for electronic request for [x], where x can be Proposal (RFP), Quotation (RFQ), Information (RFI) or Tender (RFT). Other pseudonymous acronyms include ITT (Invitation to Tender) and PQQ (Pre Qualification Questionnaire). All relate to a similar activity: a buyer requesting information from potential suppliers for the purpose of evaluation and comparison. Often this is part of a tendering exercise. The more structured this information is, the easier it is to compare the suppliers. For example, it is more effective to ask 20 multiple choice questions than it is to ask 2 essay questions, as long as suppliers have an opportunity to provide commentary to qualify their answers. Therefore, eRFX software should help the buyer to compare suppliers in useful ways – e.g., apples vs. apples.

eRFx software is a subset of eSourcing software (software that helps buyers to source suppliers), which is in turn a subset of E-procurement software.

Common features 

eRFX software is, in some respects, a subset of survey software in that it enables the user to create questions and solicit answers to those questions. Other features reflect the subtleties of tendering:
 Creating questionnaires or surveys
 Applying weighting to questions or sections which will determine the final total score.
 Issuing the questionnaires to respondents (generally a link to a web page).
 Enabling respondents to save answers, sometimes with features for preview and teamwork.
 Scoring responses
 Calculating weighting totals and providing reports / charts etc. to find the best respondent

More advanced features include: 
 Rich Questions - Some RFx products provide the ability to create questions that combine many answer elements such as file attachments, essay-style answers, and auto scored multiple choice questions. Others provide a more basic spreadsheet style line-by-line requirement set.
 Multiple scoring sets (scorecards) - the same answers are scored multiple times by different analysts. 
 Multiple weighting sets - different individuals or groups can produce different weightings to reflect their priorities. For example, Sales & Marketing might have a different view to the Accounts department.
 Detailed Auditing - buyers operating in highly regulated markets may need to provide a detailed audit trail of their actions.
 Communication - some systems provide messaging services for buyers to communicate to suppliers and vice versa. 
 Regulated Environment Rules - The scope of these may be curtailed in some environments (Public Sector, especially the EU), where it is stipulated that all suppliers must see exactly the same information from the Buyer.
 Vendor Response Importing - In some sectors the same vendors respond to similar RFXs repeatedly. RFx software can cut down duplication of effort in such areas by providing tools for vendors to import (and edit as required) previous answers. Scoring information entered by evaluators can be imported at the same time, thus providing time savings and greater consistency.

See also 
 Supply chain management

Procurement